James Jeremiah "Jerry" Wadsworth (June 12, 1905 – March 13, 1984) was an American politician and diplomat from New York.

Early life
A member of the prominent Genesee Valley Wadsworths, James J. Wadsworth was born in Groveland, New York on June 12, 1905.  He was a direct descendant of pioneer William Wadsworth, a founder of Hartford, Connecticut.

His great-grandfather, James S. Wadsworth, was a Union general in the American Civil War, killed in the Battle of the Wilderness of 1864. Both his grandfather, James Wolcott Wadsworth, and his father, James Wolcott Wadsworth, Jr., represented New York in Congress. His other grandfather was United States Secretary of State John Hay. His sister Evelyn was married to William Stuart Symington; they were the parents of James Wadsworth Symington, his nephew.

Wadsworth graduated from Fay School in 1918, from St. Mark's School, and from Yale University in 1927, where he was a member of Skull and Bones.

Career
He was a member of the New York State Assembly (Livingston Co.) in 1932, 1933, 1934, 1935, 1936, 1937, 1938, 1939–40 and 1941. He resigned his seat in 1941.

He was medically unfit for World War II because of an injured leg, but aided the war effort as an assistant manager at the Curtiss-Wright Corporation plant in Buffalo, New York. In 1950, he became deputy administrator of the civil defense office for the National Security Resources Board, which drafted many of the civil defense plans that were prepared at the height of the Cold War.

From 1953 to 1960, Wadsworth was Deputy Chief of the U.S. delegation to the United Nations. He was appointed United States Ambassador to the United Nations by President Eisenhower, and he served from 1960 to 1961.

In 1965, President Johnson appointed Wadsworth to the Federal Communications Commission, and he served until 1970. Wadsworth left the FCC to join the American team negotiating a charter for the International Telecommunications Satellite Consortium (Intelsat).

Personal life
In 1927, Wadsworth was married to Harty Griggs Tilton (1906–1965), a daughter of Benjamin Trowbridge Tilton and Anna Billings (née Griggs) Tilton. Together, they were the parents of:

 Alice Wadsworth (1928–1998), who married Trowbridge Strong (1925–2001) in 1948.

He died in Rochester, New York on March 13, 1984.  He was buried at Temple Hill Cemetery in Geneseo.

Bibliography
 The Price of Peace, Praeger, 1961.
 The Glass House, Praeger, 1966.
 The Silver Spoon: An Autobiography, W. F. Humphrey Press (Geneva, NY), 1980.

References

External links
 Reminiscences of James Jeremiah Wadsworth - Oral History - Eisenhower Administrative File - Columbia University
 "New Job for Old Hand" - Time - August 22, 1960
 James Jeremiah Wadsworth at The Political Graveyard
James J. Wadsworth Dies at 78, New York Times, March 15, 1984

|-

|-

1905 births
1984 deaths
20th-century American politicians
American autobiographers
Republican Party members of the New York State Assembly
People from Groveland, New York
Permanent Representatives of the United States to the United Nations
St. Mark's School (Massachusetts) alumni
Wadsworth family
Yale University alumni
Fay School alumni
Truman administration personnel
Eisenhower administration cabinet members
Lyndon B. Johnson administration personnel
Nixon administration personnel